Bruce W. Brown (born 6 October 1951) is a former Australian rules footballer who played with Melbourne and Essendon in the Victorian Football League (VFL).

From Essex Heights originally, Brown started his VFL career at Melbourne. He played six senior games for Melbourne in the 1971 VFL season and performed well in the reserves, sharing a Gardiner Medal with Bob Heard of Collingwood.

He spent the 1972 season at Essendon, played for Port Melbourne in 1973 and two years later joined Brunswick.

He is the son of Alf Brown, a football journalist who is a member of the Australian Football Hall of Fame.

References

1951 births
Australian rules footballers from Victoria (Australia)
Melbourne Football Club players
Essendon Football Club players
Port Melbourne Football Club players
Brunswick Football Club players
Living people